The Executioner is a monthly action-adventure paperback book series created by American author Don Pendleton. Every other month the series was complemented by the release of a "Super Bolan", titles that were twice the length of a standard Executioner novel. Following the exploits of Mack Bolan and his war against organized crime and international terrorism, both series collectively total 631 novels  (453 regular Executioner titles, plus 178 Super Bolan titles).  The series ceased publication in late 2017.

 The list below only covers up to the year 2003. For a list of the later titles, go to and scroll down to bottom of article.

Don Pendleton era (1969-1980)

1980s

Gold Eagle transition period (April 1981-December 1982)

1983

1984

1985

1986

1987

1988

1989

1990s

1990

1991

1992

1993

1994

1995

1996

1997

1998

1999

2000s

2000

2001

2002

2003

References

Lists of books